In Greek mythology, Theia (also rendered Thea or Thia), also called Euryphaessa "wide-shining", is one of the twelve Titans, the children of the earth goddess Gaia and the sky god Uranus. She is the Greek goddess of sight and vision, and by extension the goddess who endowed gold, silver and gems with their brilliance and intrinsic value. Her brother-consort is Hyperion, a Titan and god of the sun, and together they are the parents of Helios (the Sun), Selene (the Moon), and Eos (the Dawn). She seems to be the same with Aethra, the consort of Hyperion and mother of his children in some accounts. Like her husband, Theia features scarcely in myth, being mostly important for the children she bore, though she appears in some texts and rare traditions.

Etymology 
The name Theia alone means simply "goddess" or "divine"; Theia Euryphaessa brings overtones of extent (eurys, "wide",) and brightness (phaos, "light", root: φαεσ-).

Mythology

Earliest account 
The usual accounts gave her an equally primal origin, said to be the eldest daughter of Gaia (Earth) and Uranus (Sky). She is thus the sister of the Titans (Oceanus, Crius, Hyperion, Iapetus, Coeus, Themis, Rhea, Phoebe, Tethys, Mnemosyne, Cronus and sometimes Dione), the Cyclopes, the Hecatoncheires, the Giants, the Meliae, the Erinyes, and the half-sister of Aphrodite (in some versions), Typhon, Python, Pontus, Thaumas, Phorcys, Nereus, Eurybia and Ceto. By her brother-husband Hyperion she is the mother of Helios, Selene and Eos. Robert Graves also relates that later Theia is referred to as the cow-eyed Euryphaessa who gave birth to Helios in myths dating to classical antiquity.

Later myths 
Once paired in later myths with her Titan brother Hyperion as her husband, "mild-eyed Euryphaessa, the far-shining one" of the Homeric Hymn to Helios, was said to be the mother of Helios (the Sun), Selene (the Moon), and Eos (the Dawn). Gaius Valerius Catullus described those three lights of the heavens as "Theia's illustrious progeny" in the sixty-sixth of his carmina.

Pindar praises Theia in his Fifth Isthmian ode:

She seems here a goddess of glittering in particular and of glory in general, but Pindar's allusion to her as "Theia of many names" is telling, since it suggests assimilation, referring not only to similar mother-of-the-sun goddesses such as Phoebe and Leto, but perhaps also to more universalizing mother-figures such as Rhea and Cybele. Furthermore, a scholium on those lines wrote , denoting a special connection of Theia, the goddess of sight and brilliance, with gold as the mother of Helios the sun. Theia was regarded as the goddess from which all light proceeded.

Plutarch wrote a fable-like story (which is sometimes categorized as an Aesop's fable) where Theia's daughter Selene asked her mother to weave her a garment to fit her measure; the mother, who goes unnamed, then replied that she was unable to do so, as Selene kept changing shape and size, sometimes full, then crescent-shaped and others yet half her size, never staying the same.

According to sixth century BC lyric poet Stesichorus, Theia lives with her son in his palace. In the east Gigantomachy frieze of the Pergamon Altar, the figure of the goddess preserved fighting a youthful giant next to Helios is conjectured to be his mother Theia.

Diodorus's account 
An unorthodox version of the myth presented by Diodorus identified Theia as Basileia ("queen", "royal palace") with the following account:

 To Uranus were also born daughters, the two eldest of whom were by far the most renowned above all the others and were called Basileia and Rhea, whom some also named Pandora. Of these daughters Basileia, who was the eldest and far excelled the others in both prudence and understanding, reared all her brothers, showing them collectively a mother's kindness; consequently she was given the appellation of 'Great Mother'; and after her father had been translated from among men into the circle of the gods, with the approval of the masses and of her brothers she succeeded to the royal dignity, though she was still a maiden and because of her exceedingly great chastity had been unwilling to unite in marriage with any man. But later, because of her desire to leave sons who should succeed to the throne, she united in marriage with Hyperion, one of her brothers, for whom she had the greatest affection. And when there were born to her two children, Helios and Selene, who were greatly admired for both their beauty and their chastity, the brothers of Basileia, they say, being envious of her because of her happy issue of children and fearing that Hyperion would divert the royal power to himself, committed an utterly impious deed; for entering into a conspiracy among themselves they put Hyperion to the sword, and casting Helius, who was still in years a child, into the Eridanus river, drowned him. When this crime came to light, Selene, who loved her brother very greatly, threw herself down from the roof, but as for his mother, while seeking his body along the river, her strength left her and falling into a swoon she beheld a vision in which she thought that Helius stood over her and urged her not to mourn the death of her children; for, he said, the Titans would meet the punishment which they deserve, while he and his sister would be transformed, by some divine providence, into immortal natures, since that which had formerly been called the 'holy fire' in the heavens would be called by men Helius ('the sun') and that addressed as 'mene' would be called Selene ('the moon'). When she was aroused from the swoon she recounted to the common crowd both the dream and the misfortunes which had befallen her, asking that they render to the dead honours like those accorded to the gods and asserting that no man should thereafter touch her body. And after this she became frenzied, and seizing such of her daughter's playthings as could make a noise, she began to wander over the land, with her hair hanging free, inspired by the noise of the kettledrums and cymbals, so that those who saw her were struck with astonishment. And all men were filled with pity at her misfortune and some were clinging to her body, when there came a mighty storm and continuous crashes of thunder and lightning; and in the midst of this Basileia passed from sight, whereupon the crowds of people, amazed at this reversal of fortune, transferred the names and the honours of Helios and Selene to the stars of the sky, and as for their mother, they considered her to be a goddess and erected altars to her, and imitating the incidents of her life by the pounding of the kettledrums and the clash of the cymbals they rendered unto her in this way sacrifices and all other honours.

Theia in the sciences 

Theia's mythological role as the mother of the Moon goddess Selene is alluded to in the application of the name to a hypothetical planet which, according to the giant impact hypothesis, collided with the Earth, resulting in the Moon's creation, paralleling the mythological Theia's role as the mother of Selene.

Theia's alternate name Euryphaessa has been adopted for a species of Australian leafhoppers Dayus euryphaessa (Kirkaldy, 1907).

A Theia figure has been found at the Necropolis of Cyrene.

Genealogy

See also 
 List of light deities
 Theia in popular culture
 Greek mythology in popular culture

Notes

References 

 Apollodorus, Apollodorus, The Library, with an English Translation by Sir James George Frazer, F.B.A., F.R.S. in 2 Volumes. Cambridge, Massachusetts, Harvard University Press; London, William Heinemann Ltd. 1921. . Online version at the Perseus Digital Library. Greek text available from the same website.
 Athenaeus, The Learned Banqueters, Volume V: Books 10.420e-11, edited and translated by S. Douglas Olson, Loeb Classical Library No. 274, Cambridge, Massachusetts, Harvard University Press, 2009. . Online version at Harvard University Press.
 Caldwell, Richard, Hesiod's Theogony, Focus Publishing/R. Pullins Company (June 1, 1987). .
 Catullus. The Carmina of Gaius Valerius Catullus. Leonard C. Smithers. London. Smithers. 1894.
 Pseudo-Clement, Recognitions from Ante-Nicene Library Volume 8, translated by Smith, Rev. Thomas. T. & T. Clark, Edinburgh. 1867. Online version at the Theoi Project.
 
 Diodorus Siculus, The Library of History translated by Charles Henry Oldfather. Twelve volumes. Loeb Classical Library. Cambridge, Massachusetts: Harvard University Press; London: William Heinemann, Ltd. 1989. Vol. 3. Books 4.59–8. Online version at Bill Thayer's Web Site.
 Diodorus Siculus, Bibliotheca Historica. Vol 1-2. Immanel Bekker. Ludwig Dindorf. Friedrich Vogel. in aedibus B. G. Teubneri. Leipzig. 1888-1890. Greek text available at the Perseus Digital Library.
 Drachmann, Anders Bjørn, Scholia Vetera in Pindari Carmina, Vol. III: Scholia in Nemeonicas et Isthmionicas. Epimetrum. Indices, Leipzig, Teubner, 1927. . Online version at De Gruyter (1997 reprint). Online version at the Perseus Digital Library.
 Evelyn-White, Hugh, The Homeric Hymns and Homerica with an English Translation by Hugh G. Evelyn-White. Homeric Hymns. Cambridge, Massachusetts, Harvard University Press; London, William Heinemann Ltd. 1914.
 Gantz, Timothy, Early Greek Myth: A Guide to Literary and Artistic Sources, Johns Hopkins University Press, 1996, Two volumes:  (Vol. 1),  (Vol. 2).
 Graves, Robert; The Greek Myths, Moyer Bell Ltd; Unabridged edition (December 1988), .
 Grimal, Pierre, The Dictionary of Classical Mythology, Wiley-Blackwell, 1996. .
 Hard, Robin, The Routledge Handbook of Greek Mythology: Based on H.J. Rose's "Handbook of Greek Mythology", Psychology Press, 2004, . Google Books.
 Hesiod, Theogony, in The Homeric Hymns and Homerica with an English Translation by Hugh G. Evelyn-White, Cambridge, Massachusetts, Harvard University Press; London, William Heinemann Ltd. 1914. Online version at the Perseus Digital Library. Greek text available from the same website.
 Homeric Hymn 31 to Helios, in The Homeric Hymns and Homerica with an English Translation by Hugh G. Evelyn-White, Cambridge, Massachusetts, Harvard University Press; London, William Heinemann Ltd. 1914. Online version at the Perseus Digital Library.
 Honan, Mary McMahon, Guide to the Pergamon Museum, De Gruyter, 1904. . Online version at De Gruyter.
 Hyginus, Gaius Julius, Fabulae from The Myths of Hyginus translated and edited by Mary Grant. University of Kansas Publications in Humanistic Studies. Online version at the Topos Text Project.
 Kerényi, Karl, The Gods of the Greeks. London, New York, Thames, and Hudson. 1951. .
 Kunze, Max, "Theia" in Lexicon Iconographicum Mythologiae Classicae (LIMC) VII.1. Artemis Verlag, Zürich and Munich, 1994. .
 Morford, Mark P. O., Robert J. Lenardon, Classical Mythology, Eighth Edition, Oxford University Press, 2007. .
 Pindar, The Odes of Pindar including the Principal Fragments with an Introduction and an English Translation by Sir John Sandys, Litt.D., FBA. Cambridge, MA., Harvard University Press; London, William Heinemann Ltd. 1937. Greek text available at the Perseus Digital Library.
 Pindar, Odes, Diane Arnson Svarlien. 1990. Online version at the Perseus Digital Library.
 Plutarch, Moralia. 16 vols. (vol. 13: 13.1 & 13.2, vol. 16: index), transl. by Frank Cole Babbitt (vol. 1–5) et al., series: "Loeb Classical Library" (LCL, vols. 197–499). Cambridge, Massachusetts: Harvard University Press et al., 1927–2004.
 Smith, William; Dictionary of Greek and Roman Biography and Mythology, London (1873). "Theia"
 Tripp, Edward, Crowell's Handbook of Classical Mythology, Thomas Y. Crowell Co; First edition (June 1970). .
 West, M. L. (1966), Hesiod: Theogony, Oxford University Press. .

External links 

 THEIA from The Theoi Project
 THEA from greekmythology.com
 THEIA from Mythopedia

Greek goddesses
Light goddesses
Lunar goddesses
Sky and weather goddesses
Mother goddesses
Titans (mythology)
Children of Gaia
Silver
Gold
Gemstones in culture
Helios in mythology